Herbert Berghof (13 September 1909 – 5 November 1990) was an Austrian-American actor, director and acting teacher.

Early life 
Born and educated in Vienna, Austria, Berghof studied acting there with Max Reinhardt. In 1939, he moved to New York where he launched a career as an actor and director on Broadway, and worked with Lee Strasberg. Berghof became a charter member of the Actors Studio in 1947, with classmates including Marlon Brando, Montgomery Clift, Jerome Robbins, and Sidney Lumet.

Career 

In 1945, he co-founded HB Studio (the Herbert Berghof Studio) in New York City, as a place where aspiring actors could train and practice. In 1948, Uta Hagen joined the Studio as Berghof's artistic partner, and they married in 1957. They ran the studio together until his death in 1990. Notable alumni included Jack Lemmon, Al Pacino, Liza Minnelli, Robert De Niro, Geraldine Page, Fritz Weaver, Anne Bancroft, Donna McKechnie and Matthew Broderick. Despite being a charter member of the Actors Studio, he differed "with those colleagues who expounded the Method technique when his approach shifted to an emphasis on actions rather than thoughts and reactions."

Stage appearances by Berghof included roles in Ibsen's The Lady from the Sea (1950), The Andersonville Trial (1959). Among his film appearances were 5 Fingers (1952), Red Planet Mars (1952), Fräulein (1958), Cleopatra (1963), An Affair of the Skin (1963), Harry and Tonto (1974), Voices (1979), Those Lips, Those Eyes (1980), Times Square (1980) and Target (1985). He directed the first Broadway production of Beckett's Waiting for Godot (1956).

Death 
Described by The New York Times as "one of the nation's most respected acting teachers and coaches", he died of a heart ailment on 5 November 1990 at his home in Manhattan.

Partial filmography 
5 Fingers (1952) – Col. von Richter
Red Planet Mars (1952) – Franz Calder
Diplomatic Courier (1952) – Arnov
Assignment – Paris! (1952) – Prime Minister Andreas Ordy
Fräulein (1958) – Karl Angermann
Cleopatra (1963) – Theodotos
An Affair of the Skin (1963) – Max
Harry and Tonto (1974) – Rivetowski
Mastermind (1976)
Voices (1979) – Nathan Rothman
Those Lips, Those Eyes (1980) – Dr. Julius Fuldauer
Times Square (1980) – Dr. Huber
Target (1985) – Schroeder (final film role)

References

External links 

Uta Hagen and Herbert Berghof papers, 1889–2004 and undated held by the Billy Rose Theatre Division, New York Public Library for the Performing Arts

1909 births
1990 deaths
American acting coaches
American male film actors
20th-century American male actors
Austrian emigrants to the United States